Sandwell & Dudley railway station is on the Birmingham Loop of the West Coast Main Line, on the outskirts of Oldbury. The name of the station is somewhat misleading; the station is actually located between Oldbury and West Bromwich, and not near Dudley. The nearest station to the town of Dudley is Dudley Port.

History 
It was originally opened as Oldbury in 1852 and was one of two stations in the town. The more centrally located Great Western Railway (GWR) Oldbury station was located on the site of the bingo hall opposite the Sainsbury's supermarket and was the only station on the GWR's Oldbury line from Langley Green.

In May 1984, the station was renamed Sandwell & Dudley, having been demolished and rebuilt by British Rail with longer platforms capable of handling long-distance InterCity trains.

Services
The station today is operated by West Midlands Trains on behalf of Transport for West Midlands. Services are operated by Avanti West Coast, West Midlands Trains and Transport for Wales.

As of December 2022, it is served by:
2tph West Midlands Railway stopping services each to Wolverhampton and Walsall via Birmingham New Street and Aston.  
1tph Avanti West Coast services - northbound to either Blackpool North or Edinburgh Waverley (alternate hours) and southbound to London Euston. At peak times additional services start/terminate at Wolverhampton.
1tph Transport for Wales services - northbound to Shrewsbury, Chester or Holyhead & 1tp2h to Aberystwyth & Pwllheli (train divides at Machynlleth) and southbound to Birmingham International.

References

External links

Rail Around Birmingham and the West Midlands: Sandwell and Dudley station
Station plan

Railway stations in Sandwell
DfT Category D stations
Former London and North Western Railway stations
Railway stations in Great Britain opened in 1852
Railway stations served by Avanti West Coast
Railway stations served by West Midlands Trains
Railway stations served by Transport for Wales Rail
Oldbury, West Midlands
1852 establishments in England